Skjulte stjerner (Hidden Star in Danish) is a Danish television variety program, hosted by Felix Smith. The program that seeks to find new singing talent, but unlike other similar music talent competition, the program doesn't have any judging panel. Votes are done by SMS and comments received online. The program premiered on 2 September 2011 and the final was held on 14 October 2011.  

The program introduces 8 known singing stars who each presents his choice of a "hidden star" through personal contacts and through friends. In the live shows, the stars have to sing as a duo with the "hidden star" they have chosen and agreed to mentor for success. Following the performance comments and votes are received and contesting duos (a star and his/her protégé) are eliminated.

The winner of the series was Thomas Meilstrup mentored by and in duo with Tim Schou, lead vocalist of the Daniosh band A Friend in London.

Results (2011)

 – Winner
 – Runner-up
 – Received enough SMS votes to proceed
 – In danger, but saved. Except in the first live show, when there was a new vote, but where receivers of 2nd and 3rd fewest SMS votes eliminated
 – In danger and later voted out
 – Previously voted out, and therefore does not qualify
 – Received fewest SMS votes and therefore eliminated

External links
Skjulte stjerner official web page on DR1 website

Danish reality television series
2010s Danish television series
2011 Danish television series debuts
2011 Danish television series endings
Danish-language television shows
DR TV original programming